Thomas Jerome Welsh (December 20, 1921 – February 19, 2009) was an American prelate of the Roman Catholic Church. He served as auxiliary bishop of the Archdiocese of Philadelphia in Pennsylvania (1970-1974), as bishop of the Diocese of Arlington in Virginia (1974–1983) and as bishop of the Diocese of Allentown in Pennsylvania (1983–1997).

Biography

Early life 
Thomas Welsh was born on December 20, 1921, in Weatherly, Pennsylvania, one of five children of Edward C. and Mary A. (née Doheny) Welsh. Raised in a strict Irish Catholic family, he received his early education at the parochial school St. Nicholas Church in Weatherly. He then attended Schwab High School, also in Weatherly, and later began his studies for the priesthood at St. Charles Borromeo Seminary in Overbrook, Pennsylvania, in 1937.

Priesthood 
On May 30, 1946, Welsh was ordained a priest of the Archdiocese of Philadelphia by Cardinal Dennis Dougherty at the Cathedral of SS. Peter and Paul in Philadelphia He was then sent to continue his studies at the Catholic University of America in Washington, D.C., where he earned a doctorate in canon law in 1949. During his summers at the Catholic University, he served as a curate at St. Paul Parish in Philadelphia, Maternity of the Blessed Virgin Mary Parish in Philadelphia, and Our Lady of Mount Carmel Parish in Doylestown, Pennsylvania.

In 1949, Welsh became a professor at Southeast Catholic High School (now St. John Neumann High School) in Philadelphia. He was assigned as a curate at Holy Child Parish in Philadelphia in 1951, and named a member of the archdiocesan Metropolitan Marriage Tribunal in 1958. He was appointed vice-chancellor of the archdiocese in 1963. He was raised to the rank of monsignor by Pope Paul VI in September 1965, and became rector of St. Charles Borromeo Seminary in 1966. During his tenure as rector, he oversaw an extensive revision of the curriculum, which earned the seminary accreditation with the Middle States Association of Colleges and Schools; the construction of a new theology wing named Vianney Hall; and the establishment the School of Religious Studies and the School of Pastoral Studies.

Auxiliary Bishop of Philadelphia 
On February 18, 1970, Welsh was appointed as an auxiliary bishop of the Archdiocese of Philadelphia and titular bishop of Inis Cathaig by Paul VI. He received his consecration on April 2, 1970. from Cardinal John Krol, with Bishops Gerald McDevitt and John Graham serving as co-consecrators, at the Cathedral of SS. Peter and Paul. As an auxiliary bishop, he continued to serve as rector of St. Charles Borromeo Seminary.

Bishop of Arlington
Welsh was appointed by Paul VI as the first bishop of the newly erected Diocese of Arlington on June 4, 1974. He was installed on August 13 1974. During his tenure, he established six new parishes and dedicated eleven new churches. He established the Office of Migration and Refugee Services in 1975 and the Family Life Bureau in 1977. Welsh also began the diocesan newspaper, The Arlington Catholic Herald.

Walsh was the founding president of the board of the Catholic Home Study Institute which became the Catholic Distance University.  The number of Catholics in Arlington increased from 154,000 to 179,000 under his tenure.

Bishop of Allentown
Following the resignation of Bishop Joseph M. McShea, Welsh was appointed the second bishop of the Diocese of Allentown by Pope John Paul II on February 3, 1983. His installation took place at the Cathedral of St. Catharine of Siena in Allentown on March 21, 1983. During his tenure, Welsh established a "Stand Up For Life" campaign to encourage anti-abortion efforts, and frequently joined local abortion protesters for their monthly vigil at the Allentown Women's Clinic in Hanover Township. He held workshops on natural family planning and Humanae Vitae for the diocesan clergy.

Welsh established the first Youth Ministry Office in the diocese and raised $13 million in an endowment campaign for diocesan schools and other educational efforts. He was a board member and member of the Executive Committee of the National Shrine of the Immaculate Conception in Washington, D.C. Despite his reputation as a conservative, Welsh allowed girls to serve as altar servers at mass, and gained recognition for his work to improve relations between Catholics and Jews. He turned his home, a mansion purchased by Bishop McShea and bequeathed to the diocese upon his death, into a center for carrying on his pastoral work.

In 2018, Welsh was included in a report about cover-ups in six dioceses of Pennsylvania of child sexual abuse by priests. In the report, there are copies of correspondence with Bishop Leroy T. Matthiesen, referred to retired priest in Matthiesen's diocese as a recovering alcoholic. Welsh expressed concerns that the priest continue to be closely supervised. In 2002, the priest was arrested for abusing a 15-year old boy.

Later life and death 
On December 15, 1997, John Paul II accepted Welsh's resignation as bishop of Allentown.  He was succeeded by Bishop Edward Peter Cullen. During his retirement, Welsh continued to administer the Sacrament of Confirmation at parishes around the diocese.

Thomas Welsh died February 19, 2009, at Lehigh Valley Hospital–Cedar Crest in Allentown at age 87. He was buried in St. Nicholas Cemetery in Weatherly.

Notes

1921 births
2009 deaths
American Roman Catholic clergy of Irish descent
Roman Catholic Diocese of Allentown
Roman Catholic bishops of Arlington
Roman Catholic Ecclesiastical Province of Philadelphia
St. Charles Borromeo Seminary alumni
Catholic University of America alumni
Religious leaders from Allentown, Pennsylvania
20th-century Roman Catholic bishops in the United States
21st-century Roman Catholic bishops in the United States
Roman Catholic bishops in Pennsylvania
Bishops of Iniscathay